Accessory may refer to:

 Accessory (legal term), a person who assists a criminal

In anatomy
 Accessory bone
 Accessory breast
 Accessory kidney
 Accessory muscle
 Accessory nucleus, in anatomy, a cranial nerve nucleus
 Accessory nerve

In arts and entertainment
 Accessory (band), with members Dirk Steyer and Ivo Lottig
 Video game accessory, a piece of hardware used in conjunction with a video game console for playing video games
 Accessories (album), a compilation album from Dutch alternative rock band The Gathering
 Accessory, a type of rulebook in Dungeons & Dragons and other role-playing games

Other uses
 Fashion accessory, an item used to complement a fashion or style
 Accessory suite, a secondary dwelling on a parcel of land
 Rental accessories and attachments, accessories used in the rental industry
 Cable accessories for connecting and terminating cables
 Accessory fruit, in which some of the flesh is derived from tissues other than the flower ovary

See also
 
 
 Access (disambiguation)